Windows 7, a major release of the Microsoft Windows operating system, has been released in several editions since its original release in 2009. Only Home Premium, Professional, and Ultimate were widely available at retailers. The other editions focus on other markets, such as the software development world or enterprise use. All editions support 32-bit IA-32 CPUs and all editions except Starter support 64-bit x64 CPUs. 64-bit installation media are not included in Home-Basic edition packages, but can be obtained separately from Windows.

According to Microsoft, the features for all editions of Windows 7 are stored on the machine, regardless of which edition is in use. Users who wish to upgrade to an edition of Windows 7 with more features were able to use Windows Anytime Upgrade to purchase the upgrade and to unlock the features of those editions, until it was discontinued in 2015. Microsoft announced Windows 7 pricing information for some editions on June 25, 2009, and Windows Anytime Upgrade and Family Pack pricing on July 31, 2009.

Main editions 
Mainstream support for all Windows 7 editions ended on January 13, 2015, and extended support ended on January 14, 2020. After that, the operating system ceased receiving further support. Professional and Enterprise volume licensed editions had paid Extended Security Updates (ESU) available until at most January 10, 2023. Since October 31, 2013, Windows 7 is no longer available in retail, except for remaining stocks of the preinstalled Professional edition, which was officially discontinued on October 31, 2016.

 
 Windows 7 Starter is the edition of Windows 7 that contains the fewest features. It is only available in a 32-bit version and does not include the Windows Aero theme. The desktop wallpaper and visual styles (Windows 7 Basic) are not user-changeable. In the release candidate versions of Windows 7, Microsoft intended to restrict users of this edition to running three simultaneous programs, but this limitation was dropped in the final release. This edition does not support more than 2 GB of RAM.
 This edition was available pre-installed on computers, especially netbooks or Windows Tablets, through system integrators or computer manufacturers using OEM licenses.
 
 Windows 7 Home Basic was available in "emerging markets", in 141 countries.  Some Windows Aero options are excluded along with several new features. This edition is available in both 32-bit and 64-bit versions and supports up to 8 GB of RAM. Home Basic, along with other editions sold in emerging markets, includes geographical activation restriction, which requires users to activate Windows within a certain region or country.
 
 This edition contains features aimed at the home market segment, such as Windows Media Center, Windows Aero and multi-touch support. It was available in both 32-bit and 64-bit versions.
 
 This edition is targeted towards enthusiasts, small-business users, and schools. It includes all the features of Windows 7 Home Premium, and adds the ability to participate in a Windows Server domain. Additional features include support for up to 192 GB of RAM (increased from 16 GB), operating as a Remote Desktop server, location aware printing, backup to a network location, Encrypting File System, Presentation Mode, Software Restriction Policies (but not the extra management features of AppLocker) and Windows XP Mode. It was available in both 32-bit and 64-bit versions.
 
 This edition targeted the enterprise segment of the market and was sold through volume licensing to companies which have a Software Assurance (SA) contract with Microsoft. Additional features include support for Multilingual User Interface (MUI) packages, BitLocker Drive Encryption, and UNIX application support. Not available through retail or OEM channels, this edition is distributed through SA. As a result, it includes several SA-only benefits, including a license allowing the operating of diskless nodes (diskless PCs) and activation via Volume License Key (VLK).
 
 Windows 7 Ultimate contains the same features as Windows 7 Enterprise, but this edition was available to home users on an individual license basis. For a while, Windows 7 Home Premium and Windows 7 Professional users were able to upgrade to Windows 7 Ultimate for a fee using Windows Anytime Upgrade if they wished to do so, this service is still available if users want to upgrade to Ultimate from Home Premium or Professional. Unlike Windows Vista Ultimate, the Windows 7 Ultimate does not include the Windows Ultimate Extras feature or any exclusive features as Microsoft had stated.

Special-purpose editions 
The main editions also can take the form of one of the following special editions:

 
 The features in the N and KN Editions are the same as their equivalent full versions, but do not include Windows Media Player or other Windows Media-related technologies, such as Windows Media Center and Windows DVD Maker due to limitations set by the European Union and South Korea, respectively. The cost of the N and KN Editions are the same as the full versions, as the Media Feature Pack for Windows 7 N or Windows 7 KN can be downloaded without charge from Microsoft.

E edition
 The features in the E edition are the same as their equivalent full versions, but does not include Internet Explorer due to limitations set by the European Union. The cost of the E edition was cheaper than the full version.

Signature Edition
 The Signature Edition of Windows 7 is a commemorative edition of Windows 7 Ultimate for those throwing a Windows 7 launch party. It is functionally the same as Windows 7 Ultimate.

Upgrade editions 
In-place upgrade from Windows Vista with Service Pack 1 to Windows 7 is supported if the processor architecture and the language are the same and their editions match (see below). In-place upgrade is not supported for earlier versions of Windows; moving to Windows 7 on these machines requires a clean installation, i.e. removal of the old operating system, installing Windows 7 and reinstalling all previously installed programs. Windows Easy Transfer can assist in this process.

Microsoft made upgrade SKUs of Windows 7 for selected editions of Windows XP and Windows Vista. The difference between these SKUs and full SKUs of Windows 7 is their lower price and proof of license ownership of a qualifying previous version of Windows. Same restrictions on in-place upgrading applies to these SKUs as well. In addition, Windows 7 is available as a Family Pack upgrade edition in certain markets, to upgrade to Windows 7 Home Premium only. It gives licenses to upgrade three machines from Vista or Windows XP to the Windows 7 Home Premium edition. These are not full versions, so each machine to be upgraded must have one of these qualifying previous versions of Windows for them to work. In the United States, this offer expired in early December 2009. In October 2010, to commemorate the anniversary of Windows 7, Microsoft once again made Windows 7 Home Premium Family Pack available for a limited time, while supplies lasted.

Upgrade compatibility 
There are two possible ways to upgrade to Windows 7 from an earlier version of Windows:

 An in-place install (labelled "Upgrade" in the installer), where settings and programs are preserved from an older version of Windows. This option is only sometimes available, depending on the editions of Windows being used, and is not available at all unless upgrading from Windows Vista.
 A clean install (labelled "Custom" in the installer), where all settings including but not limited to user accounts, applications, user settings, music, photos, and programs are erased entirely and the current operating system is erased and replaced with Windows 7. This option is always available and is required for all versions of Windows XP.

The table below lists which upgrade paths allow for an in-place install. Note that in-place upgrades can only be performed when the previous version of Windows is of the same architecture. If upgrading from a 32-bit installation to a 64-bit installation or downgrading from 64-bit installation to 32-bit installation, a clean install is mandatory regardless of the editions being used.

Anytime Upgrade editions 
Microsoft still supports in-place upgrades from a lower edition of Windows 7 to a higher one, using the Windows Anytime Upgrade tool. There are currently three retail options available (though it is currently unclear whether they can be used with previous installations of the N versions). There are no family pack versions of the Anytime Upgrade editions. It was possible to use the Product Key from a Standard upgrade edition to accomplish an in-place upgrade (e.g. Home Premium to Ultimate).

 Starter to Home Premium
 Starter to Professional1
 Starter to Ultimate1
 Home Premium to Professional
 Home Premium to Ultimate
 Professional to Ultimate1

1 Available in retail, and at the Microsoft Store

Derivatives 
  On February 9, 2011, Microsoft announced Windows Thin PC, a branded derivative of Windows Embedded Standard 7 with Service Pack 1, designed as a lightweight version of Windows 7 for installation on low performance PCs as an alternative to using a dedicated thin client device. It succeeded Windows Fundamentals for Legacy PCs, which was based on Windows XP Embedded. Windows Thin PC was released on June 6, 2011.

 Windows 7 is also currently available in two distinct forms of Windows Embedded, named as Windows Embedded Standard 7 (known as Windows Embedded Standard 2011 prior to release, the newest being Windows Embedded Standard 7 with Service Pack 1) and Windows Embedded POSReady 7. Both versions are eligible for Extended Security Updates (ESU) for up to 3 years after their end of extended support dates. In addition, binary identical for Embedded Systems (FES) variants of Professional and Ultimate editions are also available, differing only in licensing, and with their support periods also matching their non FES variants.
  Mainstream support for Windows Embedded 7 Standard ended on October 13, 2015 and extended support ended on October 13, 2020. Mainstream support for Windows Embedded POSReady 7 ended on October 11, 2016 and extended support ended on October 12, 2021. Extended Security Updates (ESU) last for Windows Embedded 7 Standard until October 10, 2023. ESU for Windows Embedded POSReady 7 last until October 8, 2024.

Comparison chart

See also 
 Windows 2000 editions
 Windows XP editions
 Windows Vista editions
 Windows 8 editions
 Windows 10 editions

Notes

References

Further reading 

 
 
 

Windows 7